This is a list of Indonesian football transfers in the summer and the winter transfer window 2011–12. Only transfers of the Indonesia Super League are included.

Updated Transfer window on April 30, 2012.

First transfer window

Local Players

Foreign Players

Notes:
1 = Player released after four opening match in the round I.
2 = Moved after changing citizenship to citizens of Indonesia.

Second transfer window
Transfer window opening 1 April 2012 and closed on 22 April 2012.

Local Players

Foreign Players

Notes:
1 = Player released after play in the two opening match in the round II.

References

2011-12 transfers
Indonesian
Indonesian
Lists of Indonesian football transfers